Bolton is a village and former civil parish, now in the parish of Fangfoss, in the East Riding of Yorkshire, England. In 1931 the parish had a population of 130.

Bolton has an active local history society.

References

External links

Villages in the East Riding of Yorkshire
Former civil parishes in the East Riding of Yorkshire